1000 Stars is the debut solo album by Australian singer and former Rogue Traders lead singer Natalie Bassingthwaighte. It was released through Sony Music Australia as a digital download on 20 February 2009, followed by a physical release on 21 February 2009. Upon its release, 1000 Stars debuted at number one on the ARIA Albums Chart and was certified gold by the Australian Recording Industry Association for shipments of more than 35,000 units. The album spawned two top-ten singles, "Alive" and "Someday Soon", which were both certified platinum.

Background and release
In 2006, Bassingthwaighte had signed a recording contract with Sony Music Australia to embark on a solo career. She wrote and recorded 1000 Stars over three months in London, Los Angeles and Sweden with several songwriters and producers, including Paul Barry, Steve Anderson, Jimmy Harry and Ina Wroldsen, among others. The album was released digitally on 20 February 2009 and physically on 21 February 2009. The digital edition on iTunes includes the bonus track "Star".

Singles
"Alive" was released on 14 October 2008 as the lead single from 1000 Stars. It peaked at number eight on the ARIA Singles Chart and was certified platinum by the Australian Recording Industry Association for sales exceeding 70,000 copies. The second single "Someday Soon" was released on 8 December 2008. Upon its release, "Someday Soon" peaked at number seven on the ARIA Singles Chart and spent eight consecutive weeks in the top ten. It was also certified platinum. The album's title track "1000 Stars" was released as the third single on 23 April 2009, and peaked at number 30.

"Not for You" was released as the fourth single from 1000 Stars on 23 July 2009, but failed to impact the charts. "Love Like This" was released on 29 January 2010 as the album's fifth and final single. It was released to raise awareness of the AIDS Council of New South Wales' "Wear It With Pride" campaign leading up to the 2010 Mardi Gras parade. All of the single's proceeds went towards the ongoing support of the LGBT community. Unlike the fourth single, "Love Like This" managed to chart at number 88 on the ARIA Singles Chart.

Reception

For the issue dated 2 March 2009, 1000 Stars debuted at number one on the ARIA Albums Chart with first-week sales of 9,000 copies. In its second week, the album dropped to number four and sold 6,982 copies. It spent four consecutive weeks in the top ten and was certified gold by the Australian Recording Industry Association for shipments of more than 35,000 units.

Track listing

Notes
  signifies an additional producer
 "Supersensual" incorporates elements of "Heart of Glass", written by Debbie Harry and Chris Stein.

Credits and personnel
Adapted from the liner notes of 1000 Stars.

Locations
Recorded at 3:20 Studios, Los Feliz; Chalice Studios, Los Angeles; Henson Studios, Los Angeles; Metrophonic Studios, UK; The Red Room Studio, Los Angeles; SCS Studios, Hastings; Studio 44, Stockholm, Sweden; Universal Music Publishing Studios, London; Untouchable Sound Studios, London
Mixed at Air Studios; Bohus Sound Studios, Kungälv, Sweden; Metropolis Studios, London; The Red Room Studio, Los Angeles; The Strongrooms; Therapy Studio, London; Untouchable Sound Studios, London; The Vault Studios, Stockholm
Mastered at Sterling Sound, New York City.

Creative credits
Georges Antoni – photography
Mark Byrne – management
Andrew Cameron – business affairs
Debaser (debaser.com.au) – artwork
Jacqui Elmas – business affairs
Jay Dee Springbett – A&R
Michael Zupanov – A&R administration

Vocal credits
Paul Barry – backing vocals
Natalie Bassingthwaighte – lead vocals, backing vocals
Lisa Greene – backing vocals
Cheryl Parker – backing vocals
Karen Poole – backing vocals
Ina Wroldsen – backing vocals

Technical credits

Steve Anderson – songwriter, producer, mixing, instruments
Jez Ashurst – songwriter, original track programming
Paul Barry – songwriter, piano
Natalie Bassingthwaighte – songwriter
Jesse Berent – guitar
Arnthor Birgisson – songwriter, producer, mixing, programming
Chris Braide – songwriter, producer, instruments
Deyder Cintron – recording
Pete Craigie – mixing
Stuart Crichton – songwriter, producer, mixing, beats, keys, bass and programming
Jake Davies – recording, mixing
Forty4s – producers, recording
Andrew Frampton – songwriter
Matt Furmidge – mixing
Lisa Greene – songwriter
Jimmy Harry – songwriter, producer, recording, guitars, bass, keyboards
Steve Lee – songwriter
Tommy Lee James – songwriter
Jay Levine – songwriter

Tobias Lindell – mixing
Caroline Lofts – songwriter
Max Martin – guitars
Cameron McGlinchey – songwriter, producer, drums, guitars, keys and programming
Cameron McKenzie – guitars
George Nakas – songwriter, bass, guitars, programming
Adam Noble – mixing
Esbjorn Ohrwall – guitars
Brian Paturalski – producer, recording, mixing, keys and programming
Karen Poole – songwriter
Brian Rawling – producer, additional producer, additional mixing
Alex Smith – songwriter, producer, recording, keys, guitars and programming
Mark Taylor – songwriter, mixing, keys, guitars and programming
Klas Wahl – songwriter, programming, keyboards
Hattie Webb – songwriter
Charlie Webb – songwriter
Ben Wood – pro-tools editing, drums recording
Ina Wroldsen – songwriter, producer
Leon Zervos – mastering

Charts

Weekly charts

Year-end charts

Certifications

Release history

See also
List of number-one albums of 2009 (Australia)

References

Natalie Bassingthwaighte albums
2009 debut albums
Sony Music Australia albums
Albums produced by Brian Rawling
Songs written by Mark Taylor (record producer)